The  is a limited express train service in Japan operated by East Japan Railway Company (JR East), which runs between  in Tokyo and .

Rolling stock
Since the start of the revised timetable on 15 March 2014, Kusatsu services have been formed of modified 651-1000 series EMUs, which replaced the 185 series trains previously used on these services.

History
The Kusatsu service began on 1 June 1960 as a semi express between Ueno and Naganohara (now Naganohara-Kusatsuguchi). This was upgraded to become a limited express service from 14 March 1985. From the start of the revised timetable on 15 March 2014, the 185 series EMUs used on these services were replaced by modified 651-1000 series EMUs displaced from Super Hitachi services on the Joban Line.

Future plans 
Effective 18 March 2023, the name of all services will be revised to Kusatsu/Shiman. In addition, all services on the Kusatsu/Shiman will be updated to require a reservation.

Kusatsu 50th anniversary

In September 2010, 185-200 series 7-car EMU set OM03 was repainted into the Shōnan colour scheme of orange and green (never previously carried by this type) to recreate the appearance of the early 80 series EMUs, as part of the 50th anniversary celebrations of the Kusatsu limited express service scheduled for October of that year.

References

External links

 JR East 185 series Akagi/Kusatsu/Minakami 

Named passenger trains of Japan
East Japan Railway Company
Railway services introduced in 1960
1960 establishments in Japan